The 2021 Players Championship was the 48th Players Championship and was played March 11–14 at TPC Sawgrass in Ponte Vedra Beach, Florida. It was the fortieth edition held at the Stadium Course; the 2020 tournament was canceled after the first round in response to the COVID-19 pandemic.

Justin Thomas shot a four-under 68 in the final round for 274 (−14) to win his first Players, one stroke ahead of runner-up Lee Westwood, the 54-hole leader.  Defending champion Rory McIlroy (2019) missed the 36-hole cut.

Venue

Course layout

Source:

Field
The field consists of 154 players meeting various criteria; they include tournament winners on the PGA Tour since the previous Players Championship, recent winners of major championships, The Players and World Golf Championships, and leading players in the FedEx Cup standings from the current and preceding seasons. The field was expanded from the usual 144 with the late decision to include the top 125 players from the 2019–20 FedEx Cup standings.

Eligibility criteria
This list details the eligibility criteria for the 2021 Players Championship and the players who qualified under them; any additional criteria under which players were eligible is indicated in parentheses.

1. Winners of official PGA Tour events since the last completed Players Championship (2019)

Daniel Berger (15,17)
Patrick Cantlay (13,15,17)
Paul Casey (15,17)
Cameron Champ (15)
Stewart Cink
Corey Conners (15)
Bryson DeChambeau (5,12,13,15,17)
Tyler Duncan (15)
Dylan Frittelli (15)
Sergio García (2,15,17)
Brian Gay (15)
Branden Grace (15)
Lanto Griffin (15,17)
Tyrrell Hatton (12,15,17)
Jim Herman (15)
Max Homa (14,15,17)
Viktor Hovland (15,17)
Im Sung-jae (15,17)
Dustin Johnson (2,5,8,15,17)
Kang Sung-hoon (15)
Kim Si-woo (3,15)
Kevin Kisner (9,15,17)
Jason Kokrak (15,17)
Martin Laird
Andrew Landry (15)
Nate Lashley (15)
Marc Leishman (15,17)
Shane Lowry (4,15,17)
Graeme McDowell (15)
Rory McIlroy (3,11,12,15,17)
Collin Morikawa (6,8,15,17)
Sebastián Muñoz (15)
Kevin Na (15,17)
Joaquín Niemann (15,17)
Carlos Ortiz (15,17)
Ryan Palmer (15,17)
Pan Cheng-tsung (15)
J. T. Poston (15)
Jon Rahm (13,15,17)
Chez Reavie (15)
Patrick Reed (2,8,15,17)
Adam Scott (14,15,17)
Webb Simpson (3,15,17)
Cameron Smith (15,17)
Robert Streb (15)
Hudson Swafford (15)
Nick Taylor (15)
Justin Thomas (6,10,15,17)
Michael Thompson (15)
Brendon Todd (15,17)
Richy Werenski (15)
Gary Woodland (5,15,17)

Harris English (15,17), Brooks Koepka (5,6,10,15,17), Matthew Wolff (15,17) and Tiger Woods (2,7,15) did not play.

2. Recent winners of the Masters Tournament (2016–2020)
Danny Willett did not play.

3. Recent winners of The Players Championship (2015–2019)

Jason Day (6,15,17)
Rickie Fowler (15)

4. Recent winners of The Open Championship (2015–2019)

Zach Johnson (15)
Francesco Molinari (12)
Jordan Spieth (5,15)
Henrik Stenson

5. Recent winners of the U.S. Open (2015–2020)

6. Recent winners of the PGA Championship (2015–2020)

Jimmy Walker

7. Recent winners of the Tour Championship (2017–2018)

Xander Schauffele (11,15,17)

8. Recent winners of the WGC Championship (2018–2021)

Phil Mickelson (15)

9. Recent winners of the WGC Match Play (2018–2019)

Bubba Watson (15)

10. Recent winners of the WGC Invitational (2017–2020)
Hideki Matsuyama (15,17)

11. Recent winners of the WGC-HSBC Champions (2017–2019)
Justin Rose (17) did not play.

12. Recent winners of the Arnold Palmer Invitational (2018–2021)

13. Recent winners of the Memorial Tournament (2017–2020)

Jason Dufner

14. Recent winners of the Genesis Invitational (2020–2021)

15. The top 125 players who earned the most FedEx Cup points from the start of the 2019–20 season to February 29, 2021

An Byeong-hun
Abraham Ancer (17)
Ryan Armour
Keegan Bradley
Sam Burns
Wyndham Clark
Austin Cook
Joel Dahmen
Cameron Davis
Tony Finau (17)
Matt Fitzpatrick (17)
Tommy Fleetwood (17)
Lucas Glover
Talor Gooch
Emiliano Grillo
Adam Hadwin
James Hahn
Brian Harman
Scott Harrington
Russell Henley
Harry Higgs
Bo Hoag
Charley Hoffman
Tom Hoge
Billy Horschel (17)
Mackenzie Hughes
Charles Howell III
Mark Hubbard
Matt Jones
Chris Kirk
Russell Knox
Matt Kuchar (17)
Danny Lee
Lee Kyoung-hoon
Luke List
Adam Long
Peter Malnati
Denny McCarthy
Tyler McCumber
Maverick McNealy
Troy Merritt
Matthew NeSmith
Alex Norén
Henrik Norlander
Louis Oosthuizen (17)
Pat Perez
Scott Piercy
Ian Poulter
Doc Redman
Patrick Rodgers
Rory Sabbatini
Scottie Scheffler (17)
Robby Shelton
Kyle Stanley
Brendan Steele
Sepp Straka
Kevin Streelman
Brian Stuard
Vaughn Taylor
Cameron Tringale
Harold Varner III
Aaron Wise
Zhang Xinjun

Zac Blair and Bud Cauley did not play.

16. The top 125 players who fulfilled the terms of a major medical extension

Charl Schwartzel

17. The top 50 players from the Official World Golf Ranking as of March 1, 2021

Christiaan Bezuidenhout
Robert MacIntyre
Victor Perez
Lee Westwood
Bernd Wiesberger
Will Zalatoris

18. The Senior Players champion from the previous year

Jerry Kelly

19. Remaining positions and alternates are filled through the current season's FedEx Cup standings as of March 1, 2021

Doug Ghim (63rd)
Patton Kizzire (73rd)
Andrew Putnam (78th)
Cameron Percy (89th)
Jhonattan Vegas (92nd)
Anirban Lahiri (104th)
Kramer Hickok (106th)
Kristoffer Ventura (110th)
Steve Stricker (113th)

20. The top 125 players in the 2019–20 FedEx Cup regular season standings

Scott Brown
Brice Garnett
Beau Hossler
Tom Lewis
Keith Mitchell
Ryan Moore
Sam Ryder
Adam Schenk
Brandt Snedeker
Scott Stallings

Notes

Round summaries

First round
Thursday, March 11, 2021
Friday, March 12, 2021

Sergio García, champion in 2008, took the first round lead with a 7-under-par 65, two strokes ahead of Brian Harman. Defending champion (2019) Rory McIlroy was 14 strokes back at 79. Play was suspended due to darkness, with 21 players on the course.

Second round
Friday, March 12, 2021
Saturday, March 13, 2021

Lee Westwood led with a 9-under-par score of 135, a stroke ahead of Matt Fitzpatrick. The first round leader, Sergio García, had a 72 and was tied for third place with Chris Kirk who had a second round 65. Play was again suspended due to darkness, with 8 players still to complete their second rounds. 71 players scoring even par or better, made the cut.

Third round
Saturday, March 13, 2021

Lee Westwood had a third round of 68 to lead by two strokes over Bryson DeChambeau. The previous week, the two had played together in the final round of the Arnold Palmer Invitational, DeChambeau beating Westwood by a stroke. Justin Thomas shot a third round 64 to be tied for third place with Doug Ghim.

Final round
Sunday, March 14, 2021

Justin Thomas had a final round four-under-par 68 to finish with a score of 274, 14-under-par, to win by a stroke over Lee Westwood. Thomas was four shots behind Westwood after a bogey at the 8th hole. He then went birdie-birdie-eagle-birdie from the 9th to the 12th holes to take a two stroke lead. Westwood had a birdie at the 14th but made a three-putt bogey at the short 17th to drop two behind Thomas, level with his playing partner Bryson DeChambeau, who had eagled the 16th hole. Westwood had a birdie at the final hole to finish runner-up, with DeChambeau tied for third place with Brian Harman.

Scorecard
Final round

Cumulative tournament scores, relative to par
{|class="wikitable" span = 50 style="font-size:85%;
|-
|style="background: Red;" width=10|
|Eagle
|style="background: Pink;" width=10|
|Birdie
|style="background: PaleGreen;" width=10|
|Bogey
|style="background: Green;" width=10|
|Double bogey
|}

References

External links

Official Media Guide

2021
2021 in golf
2021 in American sports
2021 in sports in Florida
March 2021 sports events in the United States